The Colorado Mammoth are a lacrosse team based in Denver, Colorado playing in the National Lacrosse League (NLL). The 2014 season was the 28th in franchise history and 12th as the Mammoth (previously the Washington Power, Pittsburgh Crossefire, and Baltimore Thunder).

Regular season

Final standings

Game log

Regular season
Reference:

Playoffs

Roster

Transactions

Trades

See also
2014 NLL season

References

Colorado
Colorado Mammoth seasons
Colorado Mammoth